Dudul Dorje (1733–1797) was the thirteenth Gyalwa Karmapa, head of the Kagyu School of Tibetan Buddhism.

Dudul Dorje was born in Champa Drongsar and recognized by Gyaltsab Rinpoche at the age of four. He received an education in the monastery from the age of eight by both the Kagyu and the Nyingma schools. Dudul Dorje became head of the school at the age of 31. He was known for his great love for animals.

According to the legend, he rescued the Jokhang temple in Lhasa from flooding by placing a kata (white scarf) over the statue of Jowo Shakyamuni Buddha.

External links
 "THE THIRTEENTH GYALWA KARMAPA, Dudul Dorje"

Further reading
 

1733 births
1797 deaths
13
18th-century lamas
18th-century Tibetan people